Elections were held in Illinois on Tuesday, November 8, 1960. 

Primaries were held on April 12.

Election information

Turnout
In the primaries, turnout was 40.92%, with 2,082,667 ballots cast (1,171,488 Democratic and 911,179 Republican).

In the general election, turnout was 88.11%, with 4,845,319 ballots cast.

Federal elections

United States President 

Illinois voted for the Democratic ticket of John F. Kennedy and Lyndon B. Johnson.

United States Senate 

Democratic Senator Paul Douglas was reelected to a third term.

United States House 

All 25 Illinois seats in the United States House of Representatives were up for election in 1960.

No seats switched parties, leaving Illinois' House delegation to consist of 14 Democrats and 11 Republicans.

State elections

Governor

Incumbent Governor William Stratton, a Republican seeking a third term, lost reelection to Democrat Otto Kerner Jr.

General election

Lieutenant Governor

Incumbent Lieutenant Governor John William Chapman, a Republican seeking a third term, lost reelection to Democrat Samuel H. Shapiro.

Democratic primary

Republican primary

General election

Attorney General 

 
Incumbent Attorney General William L. Guild (a Republican appointed in 1960 after the death in office of Grenville Beardsley) lost to Democrat William G. Clark.

Originally, before his death, Grenville Beardsley (himself a Republican that had been appointed in 1959 after Latham Castle resigned to assume a judgeship)  had been seeking reelection, having won the Republican primary.

Democratic primary

Republican primary

General election

Secretary of State 

Incumbent Secretary of State Charles F. Carpentier, a Republican, was reelected to a third term.

Democratic primary

Republican primary

General election

Auditor of Public Accounts 

Incumbent Auditor of Public Accounts Elbert S. Smith, a Republican seeking a second term, lost to Democrat Michael Howlett.

Democratic primary

Republican primary

General election

State Senate
Seats of the Illinois Senate were up for election in 1960. Republicans retained control of the chamber.

State House of Representatives
Seats in the Illinois House of Representatives were up for election in 1960. Republicans flipped control of the chamber.

Trustees of University of Illinois

An election was held for three seats as Trustees of University of Illinois. All three Democratic nominees won.

Democratic incumbent Kenney E. Williamson, first appointed in 1940, won reelection to a third full (fourth overall) term. Democratic incumbent Frances Best Watkins won reelection to a third term. They were joined in winning election by fellow Democrat Irving Dillard. 

Incumbent Democrat George Herrick was not nominated for reelection.

Judicial elections

Judicial elections were held in 1960.

Supreme Court

First Supreme Court Judicial District

Second Supreme Court Judicial District

Third Supreme Court Judicial District

Lower courts
On April 12, a special election was held to fill a vacancy on the Eleventh Judicial Circuit.

Ballot measures
Two ballot measures, both of them bond issues, were put before Illinois voters in 1960.

Bond measures needed an affirmative vote equal to majority of the votes cast for whichever chamber of the Illinois General Assembly had the highest cumulative vote count.<ref name="results"/  Since, in 1960, the highest legislative vote was 4,525,191, the vote count needed to be reached was at least 2,262,596 affirmative votes. The vote also needed a majority of votes cast on each measure to be affirmative.

Bond Issue for Education 
Voters approved the Bond Issue for Education, which issued bonds to support improvements in education.

Bond Issue for Mental Health 
Voters approved the Bond Issue for Mental Health, which would issue bonds to support improvements mental health and public welfare.

Local elections
Local elections were held.

References

 
Illinois